The Ellenbogen is an 814-metre high extinct volcano in the Thuringian Rhön in the district of Landkreis Schmalkalden-Meiningen, Thuringia, Germany.

Location 

The Ellenbogen rises between the villages of Oberweid, Frankenheim and Reichenhausen in the Rhön Biosphere Reserve, and belongs to the municipality of Oberweid. As with most of the Rhön Mountains its summit is more of a gently curving plateau. Near its highest point are the dwellings of Eisenacher Haus and Thüringer Rhönhaus. From the hill summit there is a good view over the Hohe Rhön ("High Rhön"), the Milseburg and the Wasserkuppe, the latter being the highest mountain in the range. One and a half kilometres south of the Ellenbogen, the Ellenbogen Plateau climbs to a small rise that is 2 metres higher than the official summit. This rise is the 815.5 m high Schnitzersberg, which is the highest mountain in the Thuringian Rhön. In spite of that some maps give the height of the Ellenbogen as 816 metres as well.

See also 
 Rhön Mountains
 List of mountains and hills of the Rhön

Sources 
 Rhönklub e.V. (publ.), Durch die Rhön, 2001, Verlag Parzeller Fulda, pp. 102 ff
 Rhönklub e.V. (publ.), Schneiders Rhönführer, 2005, Verlag Parzeller Fulda, p. 273

Volcanoes of Germany
Extinct volcanoes
Mountains of Thuringia
Mountains and hills of the Rhön